The pharmacology of antidepressants is not entirely clear. The earliest and probably most widely accepted scientific theory of antidepressant action is the monoamine hypothesis (which can be traced back to the 1950s), which states that depression is due to an imbalance (most often a deficiency) of the monoamine neurotransmitters (namely serotonin, norepinephrine and dopamine). It was originally proposed based on the observation that certain hydrazine anti-tuberculosis agents produce antidepressant effects, which was later linked to their inhibitory effects on monoamine oxidase, the enzyme that catalyses the breakdown of the monoamine neurotransmitters. All currently marketed antidepressants have the monoamine hypothesis as their theoretical basis, with the possible exception of agomelatine which acts on a dual melatonergic-serotonergic pathway. Despite the success of the monoamine hypothesis it has a number of limitations: for one, all monoaminergic antidepressants have a delayed onset of action of at least a week; and secondly, there are a sizeable portion (>40%) of depressed patients that do not adequately respond to monoaminergic antidepressants. Further evidence to the contrary of the monoamine hypothesis are the recent findings that a single intravenous infusion with ketamine, an antagonist of the NMDA receptor — a type of glutamate receptor — produces rapid (within 2 hours), robust and sustained (lasting for up to a fortnight) antidepressant effects.  Monoamine precursor depletion also fails to alter mood. To overcome these flaws with the monoamine hypothesis a number of alternative hypotheses have been proposed, including the glutamate, neurogenic, epigenetic, cortisol hypersecretion and inflammatory hypotheses.
Another hypothesis that has been proposed which would explain the delay is the hypothesis that monoamines don't directly influence mood, but influence emotional perception biases.

Neurogenic adaptations
The neurogenic hypothesis states that molecular and cellular mechanisms underlying the regulation of adult neurogenesis is required for remission from depression and that neurogenesis is mediated by the action of antidepressants. Chronic use of antidepressant increased neurogenesis in the hippocampus of rats. Other animal research suggests that long term drug-induced antidepressants effects modulate the expression of genes mediated by clock genes, possibly by regulating the expression of a second set of genes (i.e. clock-controlled genes).

The delayed onset of clinical effects from antidepressants indicates involvement of adaptive changes in antidepressant effects. Rodent studies have consistently shown upregulation of the 3, 5-cyclic adenosine monophosphate (cAMP) system induced by different types of chronic but not acute antidepressant treatment, including serotonin and norepinephrine uptake inhibitors, monoamine oxidase inhibitors, tricyclic antidepressants, lithium and electroconvulsions. cAMP is synthesized from adenosine 5-triphosphate (ATP) by adenylyl cyclase and metabolized by cyclic nucleotide phosphodiesterases (PDEs).

Hypothalamic-pituitary-adrenal axis
One manifestation of depression is an altered hypothalamic-pituitary-adrenal axis (HPA axis) that resembles the neuro-endocrine (cortisol) response to stress, that of increased cortisol production and a subsequent impaired negative feedback mechanism. It is not known whether this HPA axis dysregulation is reactive or causative for depression. This briefing suggests that the mode of action of antidepressants may be in regulating HPA axis function.

Monoamine hypothesis

In 1965, Joseph Schildkraut postulated the Monoamine Hypothesis when he posited an association between low levels of neurotransmitters and depression.  By 1985, the monoamine hypothesis was mostly dismissed until it was revived with the introduction of SSRIs through the successful direct-to-consumer advertising, often revolving around the claim that SSRIs correct a chemical imbalance caused by a lack of serotonin within the brain.

Serotonin levels in the human brain is measured indirectly by sampling cerebrospinal fluid for its main metabolite, 5-hydroxyindole-acetic acid, or by measuring the serotonin precursor, tryptophan. In one placebo controlled study funded by the National Institute of Health, tryptophan depletion was achieved, but they did not observe the anticipated depressive response. Similar studies aimed at increasing serotonin levels did not relieve symptoms of depression. At this time, decreased serotonin levels in the brain and symptoms of depression have not been linked

Although there is evidence that antidepressants inhibit the reuptake of serotonin, norepinephrine, and to a lesser extent dopamine, the significance of this phenomenon in the amelioration of psychiatric symptoms is not known. Given the low overall response rates of antidepressants, and the poorly understood causes of depression, it is premature to assume a putative mechanism of action of antidepressants.

While MAOIs, TCAs and SSRIs increase serotonin levels, others prevent serotonin from binding to 5-HT2Areceptors, suggesting it is too simplistic to say serotonin is a "happy neurotransmitter". In fact, when the former antidepressants build up in the bloodstream and the serotonin level is increased, it is common for the patient to feel worse for the first weeks of treatment. One explanation of this is that 5-HT2A receptors evolved as a saturation signal (people who use 5-HT2A antagonists often gain weight), telling the animal to stop searching for food, a mate, etc., and to start looking for predators. In a threatening situation it is beneficial for the animal not to feel hungry even if it needs to eat. Stimulation of 5-HT2A receptors will achieve that. But if the threat is long lasting the animal needs to start eating and mating again - the fact that it survived shows that the threat was not so dangerous as the animal felt. So the number of 5-HT2A receptors decreases through a process known as downregulation and the animal goes back to its normal behavior. This suggests that there are two ways to relieve anxiety in humans with serotonergic drugs: by blocking stimulation of 5-HT2A receptors or by overstimulating them until they decrease via tolerance.

Receptor affinity

A variety of monoaminergic antidepressants have been compared below:

The values above are expressed as equilibrium dissociation constants in nanomoles/liter. A smaller dissociation constant indicates more affinity. SERT, NET, and DAT correspond to the abilities of the compounds to inhibit the reuptake of serotonin, norepinephrine, and dopamine, respectively. The other values correspond to their affinity for various receptors.

Anti-inflammatory and immunomodulation

Recent studies show pro-inflammatory cytokine processes take place during clinical depression, mania and bipolar disorder, and it is possible that symptoms of these conditions are attenuated by the pharmacological effect of antidepressants on the immune system.

Studies also show that the chronic secretion of stress hormones as a result of disease, including somatic infections or autoimmune syndromes, may reduce the effect of neurotransmitters or other receptors in the brain by cell-mediated pro-inflammatory pathways, thereby leading to the dysregulation of neurohormones. SSRIs, SNRIs and tricyclic antidepressants acting on serotonin, norepinephrine and dopamine receptors have been shown to be immunomodulatory and anti-inflammatory against pro-inflammatory cytokine processes, specifically on the regulation of Interferon-gamma (IFN-gamma) and Interleukin-10 (IL-10), as well as TNF-alpha and Interleukin-6 (IL-6). Antidepressants have also been shown to suppress TH1 upregulation.

Antidepressants, specifically TCAs and SNRIs (or SSRI-NRI combinations), have also shown analgesic properties.

These studies warrant investigation for antidepressants for use in both psychiatric and non-psychiatric illness and that a psycho-neuroimmunological approach may be required for optimal pharmacotherapy. Future antidepressants may be made to specifically target the immune system by either blocking the actions of pro-inflammatory cytokines or increasing the production of anti-inflammatory cytokines.

Pharmacokinetics
Sources:

See also 
 Atypical antidepressant
 STAR*D

References 

Antidepressants